Lac La Biche-St. Paul-Two Hills was a provincial electoral district in Alberta, Canada, mandated to return a single member to the Legislative Assembly of Alberta using first-past-the-post balloting from 2012 to 2019.

The district was created in the 2010 boundary redistribution, and was first contested in the 2012 election. It was last contested in the 2015 election, when it returned Dave Hanson  of the Wildrose Party.

History

Boundary history
The electoral district was created in the 2010 Alberta boundary re-distribution. It was created from the electoral district of Lac La Biche-St. Paul which was altered to bound current municipal boundaries. Two Hills was added to the name at the request of local residents.

The Electoral Boundaries Commission recommended splitting the district up in 2017, creating Fort McMurray-Lac La Biche and Bonnyville-Cold Lake-St. Paul, while transferring the area around Two Hills to Fort Saskatchewan-Vegreville and a small area to Athabasca-Barrhead-Westlock.

Electoral history
Since the riding was renamed, it has been represented only by the Wildrose Party of Alberta, although its antecedent had been held by several parties, most prominently the Progressive Conservatives. The first MLA was Shayne Saskiw, who was elected in 2012 and resigned prior to the 2015 election. Dave Hanson was elected to represent the district in the 2015 election.

Legislature results

2012 general election

2015 general election

Graphical representation

See also
List of Alberta provincial electoral districts

References

External links
Elections Alberta
The Legislative Assembly of Alberta

Former provincial electoral districts of Alberta
County of St. Paul No. 19
Two Hills, Alberta